Odesa Pushkin Museum is a museum dedicated to the Russian poet Alexander Pushkin in Odesa, Ukraine.

Description
The museum is in an apartment where Pushkin lived in 1823. Pushkin only spent thirteen months in the city. He arrived because he had been exiled from Moscow. Whilst he was here he seems to have enjoyed himself but the local governor was not a plan. Irritated by Pushkin's behaviour he had his mail intercepted. He managed to find passages in letters that supported Atheism and with these he was able to get the Tsar to ban Pushkin from Odessa as well.

The museum displays original manuscripts from Pushkin's writings, and a copy of a page from his book Eugene Onegin.  It was opened in June, 1961.

See also 

 Demolition of monuments to Alexander Pushkin in Ukraine

References 

Museums established in 1961
Museums in Odesa
Biographical museums in Ukraine
Poetry museums
Alexander Pushkin
Pushkinska Street, Odesa